Thelocarpon immersum is a species of lichen in the family Thelocarpaceae. Found in Alaska, it was described as a new species in 2020 by lichenologist Alan Fryday. The type specimen was collected in the Hoonah-Angoon Census Area of Glacier Bay National Park. Here the lichen was found near the park entrance growing on soil in a calcareous wet meadow in a glacial outwash plain. The specific epithet immersum refers to the perithecioid ascomata, which are immersed in "a mat of cyanobacteria and chlorococcoid algae, with only the tips protruding". The lichen is only known from the type locality.

References

Pezizomycotina
Lichen species
Lichens described in 2020
Lichens of Subarctic America
Fungi without expected TNC conservation status